George Lambert (1842–1915) was a British real tennis player. He was the world champion of the sport (1871–1885), succeeded by Tom Pettitt.

See also
 Real tennis world champions

Notes

19th-century English people
1842 births
1915 deaths
English real tennis players